José Carlos Villarreal Peinado (born 10 May 1997) is a Mexican middle distance runner. He is the 2019 Pan American Games champion at 1500 meters.

Prep
He moved to the United States with his family at age 6, graduating from Rio Rico High School in Rio Rico, Arizona.  He converted to middle distance running from the 400 meters.  On his 17th birthday, he led his high school team to the AIA Division 3 Track & Field state championship, winning the 800 meters and 1600 meters (in record time). He was also state champion in cross country.

NCAA
Next, Victor Ortiz-Rivera, James Smith, Camron Herron, Carlos Villarreal won 2020 Mountain Pacific Sports Federation Distance Medley Relay title representing the University of Arizona. Villarreal is a NCAA Division 1 All-American in 1500 m earning it at 2019 NCAA Division I Outdoor Track and Field Championships in Austin, Texas and placed 4th in the mile at 2019 NCAA Division I Indoor Track and Field Championships.

Professional
José Carlos Villarreal Peinado won 2021 Antelope Invitational 800 meters.

Personal bests
Outdoor
800 metres – 1:46.70 (Tucson 2018)
1500 metres – 3:37.22 (Azusa 2019)
Mile – 3:58.64 (Los Angeles 2020)
3000 metres – 8:42.84 (Tucson 2018)
5000 metres – 14:07.05 (Palo Alto 2019)
Indoor
1500 metres – 3:41.48 (New York 2020)
Mile – 3:56.77 (New York 2020)

References

External links
 
 

Living people
1997 births
Mexican male middle-distance runners
Sportspeople from Sonora
People from Puerto Peñasco
Athletes (track and field) at the 2019 Pan American Games
Pan American Games gold medalists for Mexico
Pan American Games medalists in athletics (track and field)
Pan American Games gold medalists in athletics (track and field)
Medalists at the 2019 Pan American Games
Arizona Wildcats men's track and field athletes